Raphael Matthew "Timmy" Chua (born October 5, 1982) is a Filipino former swimmer, who specialized in breaststroke events. He is a two-time medalist in the same stroke at the 2005 Southeast Asian Games in his home city Manila.

Chua started swimming at age eleven, when he and his brother decided to join the swimming team at the Philippine Columbian Association Sports Club. In 1995, he attended a swimming camp headed by American coach Mike Cody. He aimed three main goals: to claim a gold medal at the SEA Games, to advance further into the finals at the Asian Games, and most importantly, to place in the top 16 at the Olympics. In preparation for an international level, Chua was trained by Ryuzo Ishikawa, a Japanese import who served as his longest coach and mentor during his entire career.

Chua qualified for the men's 100 m breaststroke at the 2004 Summer Olympics in Athens, by achieving a FINA B-standard entry time of 1:04.93 from the Hong Kong Long Course Championships, three weeks before the Games were scheduled to begin. Despite of his eligibility from FINA, Chua had been battling with the Philippine Amateur Swimming Association (PASA) for failing to inform officials and not granting a permission to compete for the qualifying tournament.

On the first day of the Games, Chua challenged seven other swimmers in heat two, including three-time Olympians Jean Luc Razakarivony of Madagascar and Yevgeny Petrashov of Kyrgyzstan. He edged out Latvia's Pāvels Murāns to take a fourth spot by 0.08 of a second, outside his personal best of 1:06.37. Chua failed to advance into the semifinals, as he placed fiftieth overall out of 60 swimmers in the morning preliminaries.

At the 2005 Southeast Asian Games in Manila, Chua collected two bronze medals in the 100 m breaststroke (1:04.35) and 400 m medley relay (3:52.70), as a member of the host nation team.

Shortly after the SEA Games, Chua retired from his 12-year swimming career, when he made a final decision to finish his engineering course at the University of the Philippines Diliman in Quezon City. After a long Olympic stint, Chua is currently a technical sales and service manager for LaFarge, a multinational French company that handles cement. He is also a part-time member of the Philippine Olympic Committee board.

References

1982 births
Living people
Filipino male swimmers
Olympic swimmers of the Philippines
Swimmers at the 2004 Summer Olympics
Male breaststroke swimmers
Sportspeople from Manila
University of the Philippines Diliman alumni
Swimmers at the 2002 Asian Games
University Athletic Association of the Philippines players
Southeast Asian Games medalists in swimming
Southeast Asian Games bronze medalists for the Philippines
Competitors at the 2005 Southeast Asian Games
Asian Games competitors for the Philippines